Ursula "Ulla" Thielemann (born 18 January 1960 in Hanau) was a field hockey international from West Germany, who won the silver medal with her national squad at the 1984 Summer Olympics in Los Angeles. She was the first goalkeeper in women's field hockey to wear a helmet.

References

External links
 
 

1960 births
Living people
German female field hockey players
Olympic field hockey players of West Germany
Olympic silver medalists for West Germany
Olympic medalists in field hockey
Field hockey players at the 1984 Summer Olympics
Medalists at the 1984 Summer Olympics
Sportspeople from Hanau
20th-century German women